The Plymouth Superbird is a highly modified, short-lived version of the Plymouth Road Runner with applied graphic images as well as a distinctive horn sound both referencing the popular Looney Tunes cartoon character the Road Runner. It was the factory's follow-up stock car racing design, for the 1970 season, to the Dodge Charger Daytona of 1969, and incorporated many engineering changes and modifications (both minor and major) garnered from the Daytona's season in competition.

The car's primary rivals were the Ford Torino Talladega and Mercury Cyclone, a direct response to the Mopar aero car. It has also been speculated that a motivating factor in the production of the car was to lure Richard Petty back to Plymouth. Both of the Mopar aero cars famously featured a protruding, aerodynamic nosecone, a high-mounted rear wing and, unique to the Superbird, a horn mimicking the Road Runner's signature "beep, beep."

History

Developed specifically for NASCAR racing, the Superbird, a modified Road Runner, was Plymouth's follow-on design to the Charger Daytona fielded by sister company Dodge in the previous season. The Charger 500 version that began the 1969 season was the first American car to be designed aerodynamically using a wind tunnel and computer analysis, and later was modified into the Daytona version with nose and tail. The Superbird's smoothed-out body and nosecone were further refined from that of the Daytona, and the street version's retractable headlights (made of fiberglass) added nineteen inches to the Road Runner's original length. The rear wing was mounted on tall vertical struts that put it into less disturbed air thus increasing the efficiency of the downdraft that it placed upon the car's rear axle. For nearly 30 years the mathematic formula used to determine the exact height of the enormous wing was thought to be a highly guarded Chrysler secret. In the 1990s, a retired Chrysler project engineer (incorrectly) claimed publicly that the height was determined in much simpler fashion: it was claimed that it was designed to provide clearance for the trunk lid to open freely. This is an urban myth. The actual height was set to clear the roofline so it was in clean air. The rear-facing fender scoops were to hide cutouts. On Daytonas, the scoops were actually for ventilating trapped air from the wheel wells in order to reduce under fender air pressure and lift. For standard road going Superbirds the covers or "air extractors" were a cosmetic enhancement.

NASCAR's homologation requirement demanded that vehicles to be raced must be available to the general public and sold through dealerships in specific minimum numbers. For 1970, NASCAR raised the production requirement from 500 examples to one for every two manufacturer's dealers in the United States; in the case of Plymouth, that meant having to build 1,920 Superbirds. Due to increasing emissions regulations, combined with insurance spike for high performance cars and NASCAR's effective ban on the aero cars, 1970 was its only production year.

"Superbird" decals were placed on the outside edges of the spoiler vertical struts featuring a picture of the Road Runner cartoon character holding a racing helmet. A smaller version of the decal appears on the driver's side headlight door. Only 135 models were fitted with the 426 Hemi. As the 440 was less expensive to produce, the "street" version of the 426 Hemi engine used in competition was homologated by producing the minimum number required.

On the street, the nose cone and wing were very distinctive, but the aerodynamic improvements hardly made a difference there or on the drag strip. In fact, the 1970 Road Runner was actually quicker in the quarter mile and standard acceleration tests due to the increased downforce produced by the Superbird's nose and wing. Only at speeds in excess of  did the modifications begin to show any benefit.

Production numbers
Chrysler memos of September 1969 show that the sales programming staff were preparing to handle 1,920 winged Plymouths for 1970, but published figures say as many as 2,783 were built. The current figure generally accepted is 1,935 SuperBirds built and shipped to United States dealers, with some 34 to 47 allegedly shipped to Canada. The engine option is also questioned, although the most frequently seen numbers report 135 Hemi SuperBirds and 716 440ci. six-barrel editions, with the remainder powered by 440ci. 4bbl. motors. It is believed that over 1,000 Plymouth SuperBirds exist today.

NASCAR

In Autumn 1968, Richard Petty left the Plymouth NASCAR Racing Team for Ford's. Charlie Grey, director of the Ford stock car program, felt that hiring Petty would send the message that "money rules none". However, the Superbird was designed specifically to lure Petty back to Plymouth for the 1970 season. Petty did reasonably well against strong Ford opposition on the NASCAR tracks that year, winning eight races and placing well in many more.

While they were still legal to race, the power-to-weight consequences that would come with the smaller engine or the increased weight rendered the cars uncompetitive. Ford, in response, also designed the 1970 Torino King Cobra with an aerodynamic, superbird-style nose, but it was abandoned.

Market impact

The Superbird's styling proved to be extreme for 1970's tastes (many customers preferred the regular Road Runner), and as a consequence, many of the 1,920 examples built sat unsold on the back lots of dealerships as late as 1972. Some were converted into 1970 Road Runners to move them off the sales lot. Some manufacturers produce Superbird conversion kits for 1970 Road Runners and Satellites. Kits are also available for non produced 1971 and 1972 bodies for the Superbird. More recently they have been very steadily rising in price, regularly fetching from US$200,000 to $450,000 however this does vary based on the engine, gearbox and other factory options on the car.

The Superbird and the Dodge Charger Daytona were each built for one model year only (1970 and 1969 respectively).

References

External links

Plymouth Superbird 
Superbird and Daytona aerodynamics and history
Daytona Superbird Auto Club 
Winged Warriors/NBOA 
Aero Warriors 
The Richard Petty Museum 

Superbird
Muscle cars
Coupés
Rear-wheel-drive vehicles
1970s cars